Sergei Nikolayevich Chikishev (born 31 January 1961) is a Russian football manager and a former player. He is the manager of FC Chertanovo Moscow.

Coaching career
He led the Under-21 team of FC Dynamo Moscow to winning the Youth Championship of the Premier League teams in 2011–12 and 2013–14 seasons and was an assistant manager for the 2014–15 championship team.

In January 2020 he joined Armenian club FC Pyunik as an assistant to Roman Berezovsky.

References

1961 births
Sportspeople from Omsk
Living people
Soviet footballers
Russian football managers
FC Dynamo Moscow managers
Russian Premier League managers
Russian expatriate football managers
Expatriate football managers in Armenia
Association footballers not categorized by position